Language contact occurs when speakers of two or more languages or varieties interact and influence each other. The study of language contact is called contact linguistics. When speakers of different languages interact closely, it is typical for their languages to influence each other. Language contact can occur at language borders, between adstratum languages, or as the result of migration, with an intrusive language acting as either a superstratum or a substratum.

Language contact occurs in a variety of phenomena, including language convergence, borrowing and relexification. The common products include pidgins, creoles, code-switching, and mixed languages. In many other cases, contact between speakers occurs but the lasting effects on the language are less visible; they may, however, include loan words, calques or other types of borrowed material.

Multilingualism has been common throughout much of human history, and today most people in the world are multilingual.

Methods from sociolinguistics (the study of language use in society), from corpus linguistics and from formal linguistics are used in the study of language contact.

Locus of diffusion
It is easy to see how a word can diffuse from one language to another, as borrowing a vocabulary item from one language to introduce into another language is a straightforward way to fill a lexical gap. The borrowing of vocabulary items is called lexical diffusion. This reflects the fact that the entire vocabulary of a language constitutes a lexicon, with individual vocabulary items or words constituting being lexical item. In addition to lexical diffusion, other features can diffuse as well, for example diffusion of phonological, morphological, syntactic, syntactic, or event pragmatic features is possible.

Lexical diffusion: borrowing of vocabulary items 

The most common way that languages influence each other is the exchange of words. Much is made about the contemporary borrowing of English words into other languages, but this phenomenon is not new, and it is not very large by historical standards. The large-scale importation of words from Latin, French and other languages into English in the 16th and the 17th centuries was more significant.

Some languages have borrowed so much that they have become scarcely recognisable. Armenian borrowed so many words from Iranian languages, for example, that it was at first considered a divergent branch of the Indo-Iranian languages and was not recognised as an independent branch of the Indo-European languages for many decades.

Diffusion of other language features 
The influence can go deeper, extending to the exchange of even basic characteristics of a language such as morphology and grammar.

Newar, for example, spoken in Nepal, is a Sino-Tibetan language distantly related to Chinese but has had so many centuries of contact with neighbouring Indo-Iranian languages that it has even developed noun inflection, a trait that is typical of the Indo-European family but rare in Sino-Tibetan. Newar has also absorbed grammatical features like verb tenses.

Also, Romanian was influenced by the Slavic languages that were spoken by neighbouring tribes in the centuries after the fall of the Roman Empire not only in vocabulary but also phonology. English has a few phrases, adapted from French, in which the adjective follows the noun: court-martial, attorney-general, Lake Superior.

Direction of influence

Linguistic hegemony 
A language's influence widens as its speakers grow in power. Chinese, Greek, Latin, Portuguese, French, Spanish, Arabic, Persian, Sanskrit, Russian, German and English have each seen periods of widespread importance and have had varying degrees of influence on the native languages spoken in the areas over which they have held sway.

Especially during and since the 1990s, the internet, along with previous influences such as radio and television, telephone communication and printed materials, has expanded and changed the many ways in which languages can be influenced by each other and by technology.

Non-mutual influence 
Change as a result of contact is often one-sided. Chinese, for instance, has had a profound effect on the development of Japanese, but Chinese remains relatively free of Japanese influence other than some modern terms that were reborrowed after they were coined in Japan and based on Chinese forms and using Chinese characters. In India, Hindi and other native languages have been influenced by English, and loanwords from English are part of everyday vocabulary.

Mutual influence 
In some cases, language contact may lead to mutual exchange, but that may be confined to a particular geographic region. For example, in Switzerland, the local French has been influenced by German and vice versa. In Scotland, Scots has been heavily influenced by English, and many Scots terms have been adopted into the regional English dialect.

Outcomes of language contact

Language shift 

The result of the contact of two languages can be the replacement of one by the other. This is most common when one language has a higher social position (prestige). This sometimes leads to language endangerment or extinction.

Stratal influence 

When language shift occurs, the language that is replaced (known as the substratum) can leave a profound impression on the replacing language (known as the superstratum) when people retain features of the substratum as they learn the new language and pass these features on to their children, which leads to the development of a new variety. For example, the Latin that came to replace local languages in present-day France during Ancient Rome times was influenced by Gaulish and Germanic. The distinct pronunciation of the Hiberno-English dialect, spoken in Ireland, comes partially from the influence of the substratum of Irish.

Outside the Indo-European family, Coptic, the last stage of ancient Egyptian, is a substratum of Egyptian Arabic.

Creation of new languages: creolization and mixed languages 

Language contact can also lead to the development of new languages when people without a common language interact closely. Resulting from this contact a pidgin may develop, which may eventually become a full-fledged creole language through the process of creolization (though some linguists assert that a creole need not emerge from a pidgin). Prime examples of this are Aukan and Saramaccan, spoken in Suriname, which have vocabulary mainly from Portuguese, English and Dutch.

A much rarer but still observed process, according to some linguists, is the formation of mixed languages. Whereas creoles are formed by communities lacking a common language, mixed languages are formed by communities fluent in both languages. They tend to inherit much more of the complexity (grammatical, phonological, etc.) of their parent languages, whereas creoles begin as simple languages and then develop in complexity more independently. It is sometimes explained as bilingual communities that no longer identify with the cultures of either of the languages they speak, and seek to develop their own language as an expression of their own cultural uniqueness.

Dialectal and sub-cultural change 
Some forms of language contact affect only a particular segment of a speech community. Consequently, change may be manifested only in particular dialects, jargons, or registers. South African English, for example, has been significantly affected by Afrikaans in terms of lexis and pronunciation, but the other dialects of English have remained almost totally unaffected by Afrikaans other than a few loanwords.

In some cases, a language develops an acrolect that contains elements of a more prestigious language. For example, in England during a large part of the Middle Ages, upper-class speech was dramatically influenced by French to the point that it often resembled a French dialect.

The broader study of contact varieties within a society is called linguistic ecology.

Sign languages

Contact between sign languages 
Language contact can  take place between two or more sign languages, and the expected contact phenomena occur: lexical borrowing, foreign "accent", interference, code switching, pidgins, creoles, and mixed systems.

Contact between sign languages and oral languages 
Language contact is extremely common in most deaf communities, which are almost always located within a dominant oral language culture. However, between a sign language and an oral language, even if lexical borrowing and code switching also occur, the interface between the oral and signed modes produces unique phenomena: fingerspelling, fingerspelling/sign combination, initialisation, CODA talk, TDD conversation, mouthing and contact signing.

See also

 Areal feature
 Language transfer
 Code-switching
 Pidgin
 Creole language
 Lingua franca
 Mixed language
 Calque
 Loanword
 Metatypy
 Nahuatl-Spanish Contact
 Phono-semantic matching
 Post-creole speech continuum
 Sprachbund
 Language island
 Lexical gap
 Diffusion
 Linguistic anthropology

References

Notes

General references

Hickey, Raymond (ed.), The Handbook of Language Contact (Malden, MA: Wiley-Blackwell 2010)
Sarah Thomason and Terrence Kaufman, Language Contact, Creolization and Genetic Linguistics (University of California Press 1988).
Sarah Thomason, Language Contact - An Introduction (Edinburgh University Press 2001).
Uriel Weinreich, Languages in Contact (Mouton 1963).
Donald Winford, An Introduction to Contact Linguistics (Blackwell 2002) .
Ghil'ad Zuckermann, Language Contact and Lexical Enrichment in Israeli Hebrew (Palgrave Macmillan 2003) .